Narayan Joshi 'Karayal' is the Gujarati and Kutchi language author and story writer.

Works
Joshi founded Kachchhi Sahitya Kala Sangh in 1999 which works for the imparting basics of Kutchi to people who are not acquainted with it. He has written Kachchhi Pathavali in two parts which has been standardised by Gujarat Council of Educational Research and Training to learn Kutchi.

Recognition
Joshi was awarded the Padma Shri, the fourth highest civilian award of India, for his services in the field of literature and education in 2020.

References 

Kutchi people
Gujarati people
Recipients of the Padma Shri in literature & education
Gujarati-language writers